A monotube steam generator is a type of steam generator consisting of a single tube, usually in a multi-layer spiral, that forms a once-through steam generator (OTSG). The first of these was the Herreshoff steam generator of 1873.

Principles
For the sake of efficiency, it is desirable to minimise the steam content of the generator. Heat can then be transferred efficiently into liquid water, rather than into low-density steam. Monotube steam generators may either boil gradually along their length, usually pumped circulation systems, but where this boiling does not disrupt the circulation. Otherwise they can use the Benson supercritical system, where the pressure is sufficient to prevent boiling (within the heated volume) altogether.

Examples

Examples of Monotube steam generators include:
 Industrial steam generators 
 The water-tube boilers of the monotube type used in steam cars, such as:
 AMC
 Clayton Steam Generator
 Doble
 Gardner-Serpollet
 Locomobile Company of America
 White,  US patent 659,837 of 1900

Flash boilers

A flash boiler is a particular type of low-water-content monotube boiler. Modern use is confined to model steam boats but, historically, flash boilers were used in Gardner-Serpollet steam cars.

See also
 List of boiler types, by manufacturer
 Steam generator (boiler)
 Steam generator (railroad)

References

Steam generators